Anti-Heros vs Dropkick Murphys is a split release between American Oi! band the Anti-Heros and Celtic punk band the Dropkick Murphys. It was released in 1997 on TKO Records.

Track list

References 

1997 EPs
Dropkick Murphys albums
Split EPs